Ambridge may refer to:

 Ambridge (The Archers), a fictional place in the UK radio programme, The Archers
 Ambridge, Indiana, a former neighborhood, now part of Ambridge Mann, Indiana, US
 Ambridge station, a former railway station in Ambridge Mann
 Ambridge, Pennsylvania, a borough in the US
 Ambridge, Wisconsin, an unincorporated community in the US
 American Bridge Company

People with the surname
 Cameron Ambridge (born 1978), Australian stunt performer